The Sudebnik of 1497 (Судебник 1497 года in Russian, or Code of Law) was a collection of laws introduced by Ivan III in 1497. It played a big part in the centralisation of the Russian state, creation of the nationwide Russian Law and elimination of feudal fragmentation.

It took its roots from Old Russian Law, including Russkaya Pravda, Legal Code of Pskov, princely decrees, and common law, the regulations of which had been upgraded with reference to social and economic changes. Basically, Sudebnik was a collection of legal procedures. It established a universal system of the judicial bodies of the state, defined their competence and subordination, and regulated legal fees. Sudebnik expanded the range of acts, considered punishable by the standards of criminal justice (e.g., sedition, sacrilege, slander). It also renewed the concept of different kinds of a crime. Sudebnik established the investigative nature of legal proceedings. It provided different kinds of punishment, such as death penalty, flagellation etc. In order to protect the feudal landownership, Sudebnik introduced certain limitations in the law of estate, increased  the term of limitation of legal actions with regards to princely lands, introduced flagellation for the violation of property boundaries of princely, boyar and monastic lands - violation of peasant land boundaries entailed a fine. Sudebnik also introduced a fee (пожилое, or pozhiloye) for peasants who wanted to leave their feudal lord (Крестьянский выход, or Krestiyansky vykhod), and also established a universal day (November 26) across the Russian state for peasants, who wanted to switch their masters (Юрьев день, or Yuri's Day).

See also
 Old Russian Law
 Russkaya Pravda
 Sudebnik of 1550
 Stoglav
 Sobornoye Ulozheniye
 Law of the Russian Federation
 Law of the Soviet Union

Notes

1490s in law
1497 in Europe
15th century in the Grand Duchy of Moscow
15th-century manuscripts
Cyrillic manuscripts
East Slavic manuscripts
Legal history of Russia
Medieval legal codes